HMCS Trillium was a  that served in the Royal Canadian Navy during the Second World War. She served mainly as a convoy escort in the Battle of the Atlantic. She was one of ten corvettes loaned to the Canadian navy by the Royal Navy and the only one which remained an ocean escort throughout the war. She was named after the flowering plant genus Trillium, which includes wakerobin, tri flower, and birthroot.

Background

Flower-class corvettes like Trillium serving with the Royal Canadian Navy during the Second World War were different from earlier and more traditional sail-driven corvettes. The "corvette" designation was created by the French for classes of small warships; the Royal Navy borrowed the term for a period but discontinued its use in 1877. During the hurried preparations for war in the late 1930s, Winston Churchill reactivated the corvette class, needing a name for smaller ships used in an escort capacity, in this case based on a whaling ship design. The generic name "flower" was used to designate the class of these ships, which – in the Royal Navy – were named after flowering plants.

Construction
Trillium was ordered 20 January 1940 for the Royal Navy as part of the 1939-1940 Flower-class building program. She was laid down by Canadian Vickers Ltd. at Montreal on 20 February 1940 and was launched on 26 June 1940. She was commissioned into the Royal Navy on 31 October 1940 at Montreal. She sailed for the United Kingdom and was fully fitted out at Greenock in March 1941. Trillium was one of ten corvettes loaned to Canada on 15 May 1941. She could be told apart from other Canadian Flowers by her lack of minesweeping gear and the siting of the after gun tub amidships.

During her career, Trillium had four significant refits. The first took place at Lunenburg, Nova Scotia beginning in August 1941 and taking three months to complete. Her second overhaul took place at Galveston which was begun in April 1942 and took until June to complete. Her third refit saw her fo'c'sle extended at Boston beginning in April 1943 and was completed 10 June 1943. The final refit of her career took place in late April 1944 at Pictou, Nova Scotia and lasted two months. Afterwards she needed a further month of repairs at Halifax.

War service

Royal Navy
After workups at Tobermory, Trillium was assigned to local escort group EG 4. She remained with this group until June 1941, when she left for Canada.

Royal Canadian Navy
After arriving in June 1941, Trillium was assigned to Newfoundland Command. She remained with this unit until March 1942. During her time with Newfoundland Command, she worked with escort groups 10N, 23N, N14 and N13. On 21 April 1941 she picked up 24 survivors from the British merchant Empire Endurance that had been torpedoed and sunk the previous southwest of Rockall.

In August 1942 she transferred to the Mid-Ocean Escort Force (MOEF) after working up. She was assigned to MOEF escort group A-3. During her time with A-3 she took part in three major convoy battles; SC 100 in September 1942, ON 166 in February 1943 and SC 121 in March 1943. On 22–23 February 1943, Trillium picked up 158 survivors from three ships which had been torpedoed over those two days. She remained with A-3 until April 1943, when she departed for a major refit.

After working up and returning to service, she was assigned to MOEF escort group C-4. She remained with the group before departing again for refit. After workups in Bermuda and returning to service, Trillium was assigned to MOEF group C-3 in September 1944. While escorting convoy ON 278, she sank a coastal merchant in a collision. Trillium needed five weeks repairs afterwards. Afterwards she returned to escort duty with C-3 for the remainder of her time with the Royal Canadian Navy. She left Canada for the last time as an escort on the last HX convoy of the war.

Trans-Atlantic convoys escorted

Post-war service
Trillium was returned to the Royal Navy at Milford Haven 27 June 1945. She was sold in 1947 for conversion to a  whale-catcher. In 1950 she reappeared as the Honduran-registered Olympic Winner. In 1956 she was renamed Otori Maru No. 10 after being purchased by Japanese owners. In 1959 she was renamed Kyo Maru No. 16. She last appeared on Lloyd's Register in 1972–73. The ship was broken up by Kyusan Shoten K.K. at Akaho City in June 1971.

References

Flower-class corvettes of the Royal Canadian Navy
Flower-class corvettes of the Royal Navy
1940 ships